Mąstautai (formerly) is a village in Kėdainiai district municipality, in Kaunas County, in central Lithuania. According to the 2011 census, the village had a population of 9 people.

History
At the beginning of the 20th century Mąstautai was an okolica, a property of the Kučiauskai, Mackevičiai and Šimkevičiai families.

Demography

References

Villages in Kaunas County
Kėdainiai District Municipality